Lebedynska (Ukrainian: Лебединська) is a railway terminus in Lebedyn, Sumy Oblast, Ukraine. It is at the end of the Boromlya-Lebedynska line of the Sumy Directorate of Southern Railways.

Passenger service

The station serves both passenger and suburban train on a limited schedule.

Notes

 Tariff Guide No. 4. Book 1 (as of 05/15/2021) (Russian) Archived 05/15/2021.
 Arkhangelsky A.S., Arkhangelsky V.A. in two books. - M.: Transport, 1981. (rus.)

References

External Links

Lebedynska station on railwayz.info
Schedule for passenger trains
Schedule for suburban trains

Railway stations in Sumy Oblast
Sumy
Buildings and structures in Sumy Oblast
1895 establishments in Ukraine